Johnny Thunder (John Tane) is a fictional Western character from DC Comics. He first appeared in All-American Comics #100 in 1948.

Publication history 
The character was debuted in All-American Comics in issue  #100 in 1948 by Alex Toth and Robert Kanigher. The debut is well known for being one of the first of non superhero work by DC Comics. The series would then be renamed All-American Western and feature Johnny Thunder on the covers of the comic book series.

Fictional character biography 
John Stuart Mill Tane lived in the Mormon settlement of Mesa City, Arizona. The son of a sheriff and a schoolteacher, Johnny's mother makes him promise never to use guns and to instead follow in her footsteps. Johnny became a schoolteacher, but he soon found himself in a situation where violence was required. In order to keep his vow, Johnny created the identity of Johnny Thunder by changing clothes and darkening his hair to black. Thus, "Thunder" is not the character's genuine surname, making it unlikely that any familial connection exists between the two Johnnys.

Johnny Thunder would go on to be a member of the group the Rough Bunch.

In Impulse Annual #2 (1997), a backup story revealed that, at the time of his mother's death, Johnny Tane is inspired to create a secret identity by Max Mercury. The young Johnny is briefly under the impression Max is a genie, in a reference to the later Johnny Thunder. As revealed in DC Comics Presents #28 (1980), Johnny eventually retired from action, marrying the similarly-retired outlaw (and another All-Star Western feature) Madame .44 (Jeanne Walker), and the couple bore a daughter, Rebecca, and a son, Chuck. This was an intentional nod by writer Mike Tiefenbacher to Chuck Taine (with an I) which is the real name of Bouncing Boy of the Legion of Super-Heroes, but it has never been suggested in-canon that the latter is a descendant of the former.

This incarnation of Johnny Thunder is the one that electro-rock band Judge Rock wrote about in their 2012 song Westerner: "The first paleface wore red and blue, went by the moniker of one Johnny Thunder. He was the youngest of the crew". The track describes the pages 20 to 23 of Crisis on Infinite Earths, issue #3, when the DC western-related characters, namely Jonah Hex, Scalphunter, Bat Lash, Nighthawk and him, investigate a machine which has appeared in an abandoned mine.

References

External links
Johnny Thunder (1948) at Don Markstein's Toonopedia.
DCU Guide: Johnny Thunder I (Western)
Index of Johnny Thunder (John Tane) appearances

1948 comics debuts
Comics characters introduced in 1948
DC Comics Western (genre) characters
DC Comics male characters
Characters created by Robert Kanigher
Fictional characters from Arizona
Western (genre) gunfighters